Lee Clayton (born Billy Schatz October 29, 1942) is an American rock and country musician and composer.

Biography
His style has been described as in between rock and country. Clayton grew up in Oak Ridge, Tennessee and began to play harmonica and guitar at the age of seven. At nine years old, he received his first steel guitar.

After quitting the Air Force he moved to Nashville in 1968 and began his career as a songwriter. In 1972 he wrote "Ladies Love Outlaws" for Waylon Jennings. In 1973 he released his first album simply titled Lee Clayton, with which, as Clayton would later say, he was very dissatisfied. In the following years he continued his songwriting. He wrote songs like "Lone Wolf" for Jerry Jeff Walker and "If You Could Touch Her at All" for Willie Nelson. In 1978 his second album, Border Affair, was released. It was critically acclaimed but became a flop at the charts.

His most successful album was 1979's Naked Child. The songs' style was reminiscent of Bob Dylan and the single, "I Ride Alone", became very notable. In 1979, he went on a big world tour, which became a huge success. In 1981 he released his fourth studio album, The Dream Goes On, which had a harder sound than his previous work. After that he published two autobiographical books and, in 1990, he released a live album entitled Another Night, which was recorded on September 9, 1988, at the Cruise Cafe, Oslo, Norway. Also in 1990, The Highwaymen, an outlaw country supergroup comprising Johnny Cash, Waylon Jennings, Willie Nelson and Kris Kristofferson, had a minor hit with a song of his, "Silver Stallion", which had previously appeared on Border Affair (1978). In 1994 he released the album Spirit of the Twilight. Cat Power also covered "Silver Stallion" on the popular 2008 cover album Jukebox. In 2008 a new acoustic song "We The People" was "released" on YouTube. Today Clayton's career has largely gone silent.

Discography
1973: Lee Clayton, MCA
1978: Border Affair, Capitol
1979: Naked Child, Capitol
1981: The Dream Goes On, Capitol
1990: Tequila is Addictive (4 track CD maxi single), Provogue
1990: Another Night (live), Provogue
1994: Spirit of the Twilight, Provogue
2014: Live at Rockpalast (1980), Repertoire

Compilations/reissues
1995: Border Affair/Naked Child 2^ & 3^ LP on CD Edsel Records UK
1996: Lee Clayton 1^ LP on CD Edsel Records UK
1996: Border Affair/Naked Child 2^ & 3^ LP on CD Edsel (edel)
2002: The Essential 1978-1981 Repertoire
2003: Border Affair/Naked Child 2^ & 3^ LP on CD
2005: The Essential 1978-1981 Smd Reper (Sony BMG)
2006: Lee Clayton 1^ LP on CD Evangeline (Soulfood Music)
2008: Border Affair-The Capitol Years 2^,3^ & 4^ LP on 2CD (Acadia/Evangeline)

Chart songs as a songwriter
#25 on Billboard: "Silver Stallion" played by The Highwaymen (Nelson/Jennings/Cash/Kristofferson) [1990]

Notes
In the sleeve note of his album Another Night (1990) there's mention of U2's Bono saying that the only country singer that has influenced him was a pretty well unknown fellow named Lee Clayton.

References

External links
The Official Lee Clayton Website: LeeClaytonOnline.com
[ Allmusic entry]
Lee Clayton's discography & bio

Living people
1942 births
American country guitarists
American male guitarists
American country singer-songwriters
American male singer-songwriters
People from Russellville, Alabama
Guitarists from Alabama
20th-century American guitarists
Country musicians from Alabama
20th-century American male musicians
Provogue Records artists
Singer-songwriters from Alabama